Gabay is an English, Dutch, French, Spanish and Jewish surname, and derives from the Aramaic word Gabbai. The name is usually borne by people of Sephardic Jewish descent. For people with the surname spelled Gabai, see Gabai. Notable people with this surname include:

Yuval Gabay (born 1963), Israeli-American drummer
Eli Gabay (also credited as Eli Gabe), Canadian actor and voice-over artist
Michael "Micha" Gabay (born 1947), Swedish actor
Ilya Yankelevich Gabay (1935–1973),  was a key figure in the civil rights movement in the Soviet Union
Ronen Gabay, Israel's football player and manager

Arab-Jewish surnames
Maghrebi Jewish surnames
Sephardic surnames